The Spain women's national water polo team represents Spain in women's international water polo competitions and it is controlled by Real Federación Española de Natación.

Spain has won one World and three European Championships, making them one of the most successful women's water polo teams in the last decade. They also have won 2 Olympic, 3 World Championship, 1 World Cup, 1 World League, 3 European Championships and 1 Europa Cup medals.

Results

Olympic Games

World Championship

World Cup

 2014 –  Bronze medal
 2018 – 4th place

World League

 2005 – Preliminary round
 2006 – Preliminary round
 2007 – 5th place
 2008 – 6th place
 2009 – 4th place
 2010 – Preliminary round
 2011 – 8th place
 2012 – Preliminary round
 2013 – 5th place
 2014 – 5th place
 2015 – Preliminary round
 2016 –  Silver medal
 2018 – 5th place
 2019 – Preliminary round
 2020 – 5th place
 2022 –  Gold medal

European Championship

Europa Cup

 2018 –  Bronze medal
 2019 – 5th place

Mediterranean Games
 2018 – 1st place

Team

Current squad
Roster for the 2020 Summer Olympics.

Former squads

Olympic Games

 2012 –  Silver Medal
Laura Ester (GK), Marta Bach, Anni Espar, Roser Tarragó, Mati Ortiz, Jennifer Pareja (C), Lorena Miranda, Pili Peña, Andrea Blas, Ona Meseguer, Maica García, Laura López, Ana Copado (GK). Head Coach: Miki Oca.

 2016 – 5th place
Laura Ester (GK), Marta Bach, Anni Espar, Bea Ortiz, Mati Ortiz, Paula Leitón, Clara Espar, Pili Peña (C), Judith Forca, Roser Tarragó, Maica García, Laura López, Patri Herrera (GK). Head Coach: Miki Oca.

 2020 –  Silver Medal
Laura Ester (GK), Marta Bach, Anni Espar, Bea Ortiz, Elena Ruiz, Irene González, Clara Espar, Pili Peña (C), Judith Forca, Roser Tarragó, Maica García, Paula Leitón, Elena Sánchez (GK). Head Coach: Miki Oca.

World Aquatics Championships

 2007 – 7th place
 Patricia del Soto (GK) (C), Blanca Gil, Cristina Pardo, Irene Hagen, Miriam López-Escribano, Jennifer Pareja, Cristina López, Anna Pardo, Pili Peña, Ona Meseguer, Maica García, Laura López, Eli Gazulla (GK). Head Coach: Mar Sanromà.

 2009 – 8th place
 Patricia del Soto (GK), Blanca Gil, Olga Doménech, Irene Hagen, Miriam López-Escribano (C), Jennifer Pareja, Cristina López, Pili Peña, Clara Aller, Ona Meseguer, Maica García, Laura López, Laura Ester (GK). Head Coach: Joan Jané.

 2011 – 11th place
Ana Copado (GK), Blanca Gil (C), Anni Espar, Helena Lloret, Mati Ortiz, Paula Chillida, Lorena Miranda, Pili Peña, Andrea Blas, Ona Meseguer, Maica García, Marta Bach, Laura Ester (GK). Head Coach: Miki Oca.

2013 –  Gold Medal
Laura Ester (GK), Marta Bach, Anni Espar, Roser Tarragó, Mati Ortiz, Jennifer Pareja (C), Lorena Miranda, Pili Peña, Andrea Blas, Ona Meseguer, Maica García, Laura López, Patri Herrera (GK). Head Coach: Miki Oca.

2015 – 7th place
Laura Ester (GK), Marta Bach, Anni Espar, Paula Leitón, Mati Ortiz, Jennifer Pareja (C), Clara Espar, Pili Peña, Judith Forca, Roser Tarragó, Maica García, Laura López, Patri Herrera (GK). Head Coach: Miki Oca.

2017 –  Silver Medal
Laura Ester (GK), Marta Bach, Anni Espar, Bea Ortiz, Mati Ortiz, Helena Lloret, Clara Espar, Pili Peña (C), Judith Forca, Paula Crespí, Anna Gual, Paula Leitón, Sandra Domene (GK). Head Coach: Miki Oca.

2019 –  Silver Medal
Laura Ester (GK), Marta Bach, Anni Espar, Bea Ortiz, Roser Tarragó, Irene González, Clara Espar, Pili Peña (C), Judith Forca, Paula Crespí, Maica García, Paula Leitón, Elena Sánchez (GK). Head Coach: Miki Oca.

European Championships

 2008 –  Silver Medal
 Patricia del Soto (GK), Blanca Gil, Cristina Pardo, Irene Hagen, Miriam López-Escribano (C), Jennifer Pareja, Cristina López, Anna Pardo, Pili Peña, Ona Meseguer, Maica García, Laura López, Laura Ester (GK). Head Coach: Vicenç Tarrés.

 2010 – 6th place
Laura Ester (GK), Blanca Gil (C), Anni Espar, Roser Tarragó, Mati Ortiz, Helena Lloret, Lorena Miranda, Pili Peña, Andrea Blas, Ona Meseguer, Maica García, Teresa Gorría, Paula Bugallo (GK). Head Coach: Miki Oca.

 2012 – 5th place
Laura Ester (GK), Paula Chillida, Anni Espar, Roser Tarragó, Mati Ortiz, Jennifer Pareja (C), Lorena Miranda, Pili Peña, Andrea Blas, Ona Meseguer, Maica García, Laura López, Patri Herrera (GK). Head Coach: Miki Oca.

 2014 –  Gold Medal
Laura Ester (GK), Marta Bach, Anni Espar, Roser Tarragó, Mati Ortiz, Jennifer Pareja (C), Lorena Miranda, Pili Peña, Andrea Blas, Ona Meseguer, Maica García, Laura López, Patri Herrera (GK). Head Coach: Miki Oca.

2016 – 4th place
Laura Ester (GK), Marta Bach, Anni Espar, Paula Leitón, Mati Ortiz, Jennifer Pareja (C), Clara Espar, Pili Peña, Judith Forca, Roser Tarragó, Maica García, Laura López, Patri Herrera (GK). Head Coach: Miki Oca.

 2018 –  Bronze Medal
Laura Ester (GK), Marta Bach, Anni Espar, Bea Ortiz, Mati Ortiz, Helena Lloret, Clara Espar, Pili Peña (C), Judith Forca, Anna Gual, Maica García, Paula Leitón, Elena Sánchez (GK). Head Coach: Miki Oca.

2020 –  Gold Medal
Laura Ester (GK), Marta Bach, Anni Espar, Bea Ortiz, Roser Tarragó, Irene González, Clara Espar, Pili Peña (C), Judith Forca, Paula Crespí, Maica García, Paula Leitón, Elena Sánchez (GK). Head Coach: Miki Oca.

Other tournaments

 2014 World Cup –  Bronze Medal
Patri Herrera (GK), Marta Bach, Anni Espar, Bea Ortiz, Mati Ortiz (C), Helena Lloret, Clara Espar, Lorena Miranda, Mar Pastor, Roser Tarragó, Paula Chillida, Laura Vicente, Elena Sánchez (GK). Head Coach: Miki Oca.

2016 World League –  Silver Medal
Laura Ester (GK), Marta Bach, Anni Espar, Bea Ortiz, Mati Ortiz, Paula Leitón, Clara Espar, Pili Peña (C), Judith Forca, Roser Tarragó, Maica García, Laura López, Patri Herrera (GK), Irene González, Elena Sánchez (GK). Head Coach: Miki Oca.

2018 Europa Cup –  Bronze Medal
Laura Ester (GK), Marta Bach, Anni Espar, Bea Ortiz, Mati Ortiz, Helena Lloret, Clara Espar, Pili Peña (C), Judith Forca, Paula Crespí, Maica García, Paula Leitón, Elena Sánchez (GK). Head Coach: Miki Oca.

2018 Mediterranean Games –  Gold Medal
Laura Ester (GK), Marta Bach, Anni Espar, Bea Ortiz, Mati Ortiz, Helena Lloret, Clara Espar, Pili Peña (C), Judith Forca, Anna Gual, Maica García, Paula Leitón, Elena Sánchez (GK). Head Coach: Miki Oca.

Youth teams

U-20
 FINA Junior Water Polo World Championships
 Winner: 2011, 2021
 Runner-up: 2013, 2015
 Third place: 2003

U-18
 FINA Youth Water Polo World Championships
 Winner: 2018
 Runner-up: 2016

U-19
 LEN European U19 Water Polo Championship
 Winner: 2018
 Runner-up: 2010, 2016
 Third place: 2002, 2014

U-17
 LEN European U17 Water Polo Championship
 Winner: 2017, 2019
Runner-up: 2013, 2015
 Third place: 2011

See also
 Spain women's Olympic water polo team records and statistics
 Spain men's national water polo team
 List of world champions in women's water polo

References

External links

Women's water polo in Spain
Women's national water polo teams